Bolesław Drewek (26 November 1903 – 11 November 1972) was a Polish rower of German origin, who competed in the 1928 Summer Olympics.

Drewek was born in Schwornigatz, Conitz in 1903. In 1928 he won the bronze medal as coxswain of the Polish boat in the coxed four event. He died in Gdańsk.

References

External links
 Profile at Database Olympics

1903 births
1972 deaths
Polish male rowers
Coxswains (rowing)
Olympic rowers of Poland
Rowers at the 1928 Summer Olympics
Olympic bronze medalists for Poland
Olympic medalists in rowing
People from Chojnice County
People from West Prussia
Sportspeople from Pomeranian Voivodeship
Medalists at the 1928 Summer Olympics